Cokaliong Shipping Lines, Inc. (CSLI) is a shipping line based in Cebu City, Philippines. It operates both passenger and cargo ferries on eight routes in the Visayas and Mindanao regions and is one of the youngest shipping companies in the Philippines.

CSLI was organized in 1989 by Chester Enterprises, Inc., a textile and ready-to-wear enterprise started in 1969 that diversified into the shipping business with the purchase a vessel from Japan in 1998, christened the M/V Filipinas Ozamis. In May 2012, the company acquired its ninth vessel, a 3,000-ton, 850-passenger vessel from Japan. On March 9, 2013, the line opened its 13th port of call with the opening of Cebu-Nasipit route. Through the years, the company has acquired twelve (12) RORO passenger and cargo vessels traveling the national waters.

Vessels

Current Vessels (12 ships)
 M/V Filipinas Cebu 
 She was built in 1993 by Naikai Zosen in Setoda, Japan. CSLI acquired her in 2007 from Ise Bay Ferry or Isewan (Ise-wan) Ferry in Japan, where she was known as the Mikawa Maru. She is the first ship with a computerized engine monitoring system of Cokaliong Shipping. She is able to carry up to 686 passengers.
 M/V Filipinas Dapitan
 M/V Filipinas Dumaguete
 M/V Filipinas Iloilo
 M/V Filipinas Maasin
 M/V Filipinas Ozamis
 M/V Filipinas Iligan
 She was built in 1978. She was the former Ferry Fukue  that was acquired by Cokaliong Shipping Lines from Kyushu Kaiun in 2011. She has a passenger capacity of 850 pax.
 M/V Filipinas Butuan
 She was built in 1982. She was the former Ferry Nagasaki  that was acquired by Cokaliong Shipping Lines from Kyushu Kaiun in 2012. She has a passenger capacity of 850 pax.
 M/V Filipinas Nasipit
 She was built in 1992. She was the former M/V Taiko that was acquired by Cokaliong Shipping Lines from Nomo Shosen Company Ltd in 2014. She has a passenger capacity of 685 pax 
 M/V Filipinas Jagna 
 Built in 1997, she is the former M/V Eins Soya in Japan, before being purchased by CSLI from Japan in 2016. She can accommodate as much as 625 passengers as well as cargo.
 M/V Filipinas Surigao del Norte
 She is the former M/V Avrora Okushiri, the newest acquisition of Cokaliong Shipping, purchased in 2016 and. She was built in 1999, and is the sister ship of the M/V Filipinas Jagna. She is the third vessel to have the third ship in the Cokaliong fleet to have a computerized engine monitoring system. She plies the Cebu-Surigao route. 
 M/V Filipinas Cagayan de Oro
 Built in 2000, she is the former M/V Ferry Toshima in Japan. It serves Cebu-Cagayan de Oro and Cagayan de Oro-Jagna (Bohol) route.
M/V Filipinas Mindanao
She is the former M/V Feelease Soya of Heart Land Ferry, the newest acquisition of Cokaliong Shipping, purchased in 2019.
New Vessel/s
M/V Filipinas Agusan del Norte
A brand new Ropax ferry featuring the first X-Bow/reverse bow on a passenger ferry
M/V Filipinas Ubay
Built in 2003, she is the former Seto II of Shikoku Kisen Co. Ltd. of Japan, she will arrive in the Philippines next month.
Former Vessels
 M/V Filipinas Surigao (sold to Roble Shipping Inc. and was renamed M/V Sacred Stars).
 M/V Filipinas Siargao - formerly the M/V Gingoog City, originally a fishing vessel converted into a passenger ferry; sold to breakers in 1997.
 M/V Filipinas Tandag - the company's first ship acquired from Trans-Asia Shipping Lines where she was formerly known as the M/V Asia Philippines.
 M/V Filipinas Dinagat - Destroyed by fire while en route from Cebu City to Palompon, Leyte with no casualties on July 23, 2020. The vessel is former Soya Maru No. 2 of Higashi Nihon Ferry of Japan and was acquired by Cokaliong Shipping Lines in 1994.

Ports 
Cokaliong Shipping Lines' main port of call is Cebu City.

Other ports of call are:

Former ports:
 Larena, Siquijor
 Sindangan, Zamboanga del Norte
 Baybay, Leyte
 Tagbilaran City

Routes
As of July 2022:

Incidents and accidents

On July 23, 2020, M/V Filipinas Dinagat was caught fire off the coast of Northern Cebu  while underway to Palompon. As reported, there were no passengers and all the crew including the captains were rescued. The fire was placed under control around 10am the next day.
M/V Filipinas Cebu ran aground at 12:08am on August 9, 2022 in Iloilo. The captain was reportedly asleep. All crew members and passengers on board were safe.

See also 
 List of shipping companies in the Philippines
 2GO Travel
 Weesam Express
 Ever Shipping Lines Inc.
 Aleson Shipping Lines
 Montenegro Shipping Lines

References

Companies based in Cebu City
Ferry companies of the Philippines
Shipping companies of the Philippines
Transportation in Luzon
Transportation in Cebu